Falcon 1 was a small-lift launch vehicle that was operated from 2006 to 2009 by SpaceX, an American aerospace manufacturer. On 28 September 2008, Falcon 1 became the first privately-developed fully liquid-fueled launch vehicle to go into orbit around the Earth.

The two-stage-to-orbit rocket used LOX/RP-1 for both stages, the first powered by a single Merlin engine and the second powered by a single Kestrel engine. It was designed by SpaceX from the ground up.

The vehicle was launched a total of five times. After three failed launch attempts, Falcon 1 achieved orbit on its fourth attempt in September 2008 with a mass simulator as a payload. On 14 July 2009, Falcon 1 made its second successful flight, delivering the Malaysian RazakSAT satellite to orbit on SpaceX's first commercial launch (fifth and final launch overall). Following this flight, the Falcon 1 was retired and succeeded by Falcon 9.

SpaceX had announced an enhanced variant, the Falcon 1e, but development was stopped in favor of Falcon 9.

History

Private funding 
The Falcon 1 rocket was developed with private funding. 
The only other orbital launch vehicles to be privately funded and developed were the Conestoga in 1982; and Pegasus, first launched in 1990, which uses a large aircraft as its launch platform.

The total development cost of Falcon 1 was approximately US$90 million to US$100 million. 

While the development of Falcon 1 was privately funded, the first two Falcon 1 launches were purchased by the United States Department of Defense under a program that evaluates new US launch vehicles suitable for use by DARPA.

Cancelled launches 
As part of a US$15 million contract, Falcon 1 was to carry the TacSat-1 in 2005. By late May 2005, SpaceX stated that Falcon 1 was ready to launch TacSat-1 from Vandenberg. But the Air Force did not want the launch of an untested rocket to occur until the final Titan IV flew from nearby SLC 4E. Subsequent and repeated delays due to Falcon 1 launch failures delayed TacSat-1's launch. After TacSat-2 was launched on an Orbital Sciences Minotaur I on 16 December 2006, the Department of Defense re-evaluated the need for launching TacSat-1. In August 2007, the Department of Defense canceled the planned launch of TacSat-1 because all of the TacSat objectives had been met.

An August 2005 update on SpaceX's website  showed 6 launches planned for Falcon 1, with customers including MDA Corp (CASSIOPE, which eventually launched in 2013 on Falcon 9), Swedish Space Corp and US Air Force.

Design 
According to SpaceX, the Falcon 1 was designed to minimize price per launch for low-Earth-orbit satellites, increase reliability, and optimize flight environment and time to launch. It also was used to verify components and structural design concepts that would be reused in the Falcon 9.

First stage 
The first stage was made from friction-stir-welded 2219 aluminum alloy. It employs a common bulkhead between the LOX and RP-1 tanks, as well as flight pressure stabilization. It can be transported safely without pressurization (like the heavier Delta II isogrid design) but gains additional strength when pressurized for flight (like the Atlas II, which could not be transported unpressurized). The parachute system, built by Irvin Para­chute Corp­oration, uses a high-speed drogue chute and a main chute.

For the first two launches, the Falcon 1 used a Merlin 1A engine. An improved version of the Merlin 1A, the Merlin 1B, was supposed to fly on later flights of the Falcon 1, although it was further improved to create the Merlin 1C, which was first flown on the third Falcon 1 flight, and on the first 5 flights of the Falcon 9. The Falcon 1 first stage was powered by a single pump-fed Merlin 1C engine burning RP-1 and liquid oxygen providing  of sea-level thrust and a specific impulse of 245 s (vacuum Isp 290 s).  The first stage burns to depletion, taking around 169 seconds to do so.

Second stage 
The second stage Falcon 1 tanks were built with a cryogenic-compatible 2014 aluminum alloy,
with the plan to move to aluminum-lithium alloy on the Falcon 1e.
The helium pressurization system pumps propellant to the engine, supplies heated pressurized gas for the attitude control thrusters, and is used for zero-g propellant accumulation prior to engine restart. The Kestrel engine includes a titanium heat exchanger to pass waste heat to the helium, thereby greatly extending its work capacity. 
The pressure tanks are composite overwrapped pressure vessels made by Arde corporation with inconel alloy and are the same as those used in the Delta III.

Reusability 
The first stage was originally planned to return by parachute to a water landing and be recovered for reuse, but this capability was never demonstrated. The second stage was not designed to be reusable.

Launch sequence 
At launch, the first stage engine (Merlin) is ignited and throttled to full power while the launcher is restrained and all systems are verified by the flight computer. If the systems are operating correctly, the rocket is released and clears the tower in about seven seconds. The first-stage burn lasts about 2 minutes and 49 seconds. Stage separation is accomplished with explosive bolts and a pneumatically actuated pusher system. The second stage Kestrel engine burns for about six minutes, inserting the payload into a low Earth orbit. It is capable of multiple restarts.

Pricing 
SpaceX quoted Falcon 1 launch prices as being the same for all customers. In 2005 Falcon 1 was advertised as costing $5.9 million ($7.3 million when adjusted for inflation in 2015). In 2006 until 2007 the quoted price of the rocket when operational was $6.7 million. In late 2009 SpaceX announced new prices for the Falcon 1 and 1e at $7 million and $8.5 million respectively, with small discounts available for multi-launch contracts, and in 2012 announced that payloads originally selected as flying on the Falcon 1 and 1e would fly as secondary payloads on the Falcon 9.

It was SpaceX's offering intended to open up the smallsat launch market to competition.

Launch sites 

All flights were launched from Kwajalein Atoll using the SpaceX launch facility on Omelek Island and range facilities of the Reagan Test Site.

Vandenberg AFB Space Launch Complex 3W was the original launch site for Falcon 1, but it was abandoned at the test-fire stage due to persistent schedule conflicts with adjacent launch pads. Cape Canaveral Air Force Station Space Launch Complex 40 (the Falcon 9 pad) was considered for Falcon 1 launches but never developed before Falcon 1 was retired.

Variants

Launches
Falcon 1 made five launches. The first three failed, however the subsequent two flights were successful, the first successful launch making it the first privately funded and developed liquid-propellant rocket to reach orbit. The fifth launch was its first commercial flight, and placed RazakSAT into low Earth orbit.

First flight

The maiden flight of the Falcon 1 was postponed several times because of various technical issues with the new vehicle. Scheduling conflicts with a Titan IV launch at Vandenberg AFB also caused delays and resulted in the launch moving to the Reagan Test Site in the Kwajalein Atoll. The maiden launch was scheduled for 31 October 2005, but was held off, then rescheduled for 25 November, which also did not occur.  Another attempt was made on 19 December 2005 but was scrubbed when a faulty valve caused a vacuum in the first stage fuel tank which sucked inward and caused structural damage. After replacing the first stage, Falcon 1 launched Saturday, 25 March 2006 at 09:30 local time. The DARPA payload was the United States Air Force Academy's FalconSAT–2, which would have measured space plasma phenomena.

The launch took place on Saturday, 24 March 2006 at 22:30 UTC, from the SpaceX launch site on Omelek Island in the Marshall Islands. It ended in failure less than a minute into the flight because of a fuel line leak and subsequent fire. The vehicle had a noticeable rolling motion after liftoff, as shown on the launch video, rocking back and forth a bit, and then at T+26 seconds rapidly pitched over. Impact occurred at T+41 seconds onto a dead reef about 250 feet from the launch site. The FalconSAT–2 payload separated from the booster and landed on the island, with damage reports varying from slight to significant. SpaceX initially attributed the fire to an improperly tightened fuel-line nut. A later review by DARPA found that the nut was properly tightened, since its locking wire was still in place, but had failed because of corrosion from saltwater spray.

SpaceX implemented numerous changes to the rocket design and software to prevent this type of failure from recurring, including stainless steel to replace aluminum hardware (which is actually less expensive, although the trade off is being a little heavier in weight) and pre-liftoff computer checks that increased by a factor of thirty.

Second flight
The second test flight was originally scheduled for January 2007, but was delayed because of problems with the second stage. Before the January launch date, SpaceX had stated earlier potential launch dates, moving from September 2006 to November and December. In December the launch was rescheduled for 9 March, but delayed because of range availability issues caused by a Minuteman III test flight, which would re-enter over Kwajelein. The launch attempt on 19 March was delayed 45 minutes from 23:00 GMT because of a data-relay issue, and then scrubbed 1 minute 2 seconds before launch at 23:45 because of a computer issue, whereby the safety computer incorrectly detected a transmission failure caused by a hardware delay of a few milliseconds in the process. 20 March attempt was delayed 65 minutes from an originally planned time of 23:00 because of a problem with communications between one of the NASA experiments in the payload and the TDRS system.

The first launch attempt on 21 March 2007 was aborted at 00:05 GMT at the last second before launch and after the engine had ignited. It was, however, decided that another launch should be made the same day. The rocket successfully left the launch pad at 01:10 GMT on 21 March 2007 with a DemoSat payload for DARPA and NASA. The rocket performed well during the first-stage burn. However, during staging, the interstage fairing on the top of the first stage bumped the second-stage engine bell. The bump occurred as the second-stage nozzle exited the interstage, with the first stage rotating much faster than expected (a rotation rate of about 2.5°/s vs. expected rate of 0.5°/s maximum), thereby making contact with the niobium nozzle of the second stage. Elon Musk reported that the bump did not appear to have caused damage, and that the reason why they chose a niobium skirt instead of carbon–carbon was to prevent problematic damage in the event of such incidents. Shortly after second-stage ignition, a stabilization ring detached from the engine bell as designed. At around T+4:20, a circular coning oscillation began, which increased in amplitude until video was lost. At T+5:01, the vehicle started to roll, and telemetry ended. According to Elon Musk, the second-stage engine shut down at T+7:30 because of a roll-control issue. Sloshing of propellant in the LOX tank increased oscillation. This oscillation would normally have been dampened by the Thrust Vector Control system in the second stage, but the bump to the second nozzle during separation caused an overcompensation in the correction. The rocket continued to within one minute of its desired location and also managed to deploy the satellite mass-simulator ring. While the webcast video ended prematurely, SpaceX was able to retrieve telemetry for the entire flight. The status of the first stage is unknown; it was not recovered because of problems with a nonfunctioning GPS tracking device.

SpaceX characterized the test flight as a success, having flight-proven over 95% of Falcon 1's systems. Their primary objectives for this launch were to test responsive launch procedures and gather data. The SpaceX team planned both a diagnosis and solution vetted by third-party experts, believing that the slosh issue could be corrected by adding baffles to the second-stage LOX tank and adjusting the control logic. Furthermore, the Merlin shutdown transient was to be addressed by initiating shutdown at a much lower thrust level, albeit at some risk to engine reusability. The SpaceX team wished to work on the problem to avoid a recurrence as they changed over into the operational phase for Falcon 1.

Third flight

SpaceX attempted the third Falcon 1 launch on 3 August 2008 (GMT) from Kwajalein. This flight carried the Trailblazer (Jumpstart-1) satellite for the US Air Force, the NanoSail-D and PREsat nanosatellites for NASA and a space burial payload for Celestis. The rocket did not reach orbit. However, the first stage, with the new Merlin 1C engine, performed perfectly.

When preparing for launch, an earlier launch attempt was delayed by the unexpected slow loading of helium onto the Falcon 1; thus exposing the fuel and oxidizer to the cryogenic helium, rendering the vehicle in a premature launch state. Still within the specified window, the launch attempt was recycled, but aborted half a second before lift-off because of a sensor misreading. The problem was resolved, and the launch was again recycled. With 25 minutes left in the launch window, the Falcon 1 lifted off from Omelek Island at 03:35 UTC. During the launch, small vehicle roll oscillations were visible. Stage separation occurred as planned, but because residual fuel in the new Merlin 1C engine evaporated and provided transient thrust, the first stage recontacted the second stage, preventing successful completion of the mission.

The SpaceX flight-3 mission summary indicated that flight 4 would take place as planned and that the failure of flight 3 did not make any technology upgrades necessary. A longer time between first-stage engine shutdown and stage separation was declared to be enough. The full video of the third launch attempt was made public by SpaceX a few weeks after the launch.

Musk blamed himself for the failure of this launch, as well as the two prior attempts, explaining at the 2017 International Astronautical Congress that his role as chief engineer in the early Falcon 1 launches was not by choice and almost bankrupted the company before succeeding:
And the reason that I ended up being the chief engineer or chief designer, was not because I want to, it's because I couldn't hire anyone. Nobody good would join. So I ended up being that by default. And I messed up the first three launches. The first three launches failed. Fortunately the fourth launch which was – that was the last money that we had for Falcon 1 – the fourth launch worked, or that would have been it for SpaceX.

Musk further explained the situation to Ars Technica journalist Eric Berger:
At the time I had to allocate a lot of capital to Tesla and SolarCity, so I was out of money. We had three failures under our belt. So it's pretty hard to go raise money. The recession is starting to hit. The Tesla financing round that we tried to raise that summer had failed. I got divorced. I didn't even have a house. My ex-wife had the house. So it was a shitty summer.

Fourth flight

Following the three prior failures, the SpaceX team assembled the fourth rocket using available parts in six weeks as a last chance for the company. A Boeing C-17 Globemaster III was chartered to quickly deliver the rocket, but along the way, the rocket partially imploded when depressurization exceeded what the SpaceX team had expected from the C-17's manual and the rocket had to undergo emergency repairs to be saved. Despite the challenges, the fourth flight of the Falcon 1 rocket successfully flew on 28 September 2008, delivering a 165-kilogram (363-pound) non-functional boilerplate spacecraft into low Earth orbit. It was Falcon 1's first successful launch and the first successful orbital launch of any privately funded and developed, fully liquid-propelled carrier rocket.

The launch occurred from Omelek Island, part of the Kwajalein Atoll in the Marshall Islands. Liftoff occurred at 23:15 UTC on 28 September 15 minutes into a 5-hour launch window. If the launch had been scrubbed, it could have been conducted during the same window until 1 October. 9 minutes 31 seconds after launch, the second-stage engine shut down, after the vehicle reached orbit. The initial orbit was reported to be about 330 × 650 km.
Following a coast period, the second stage restarted and performed a successful second burn, resulting in a final orbit of 621 × 643 km × 9.35°.

The rocket followed the same trajectory as the previous flight, which failed to place the Trailblazer, NanoSail-D, PRESat and Celestis Explorers spacecraft into orbit. No major changes were made to the rocket, other than increasing the time between first-stage burnout and second-stage separation. This minor change addressed the failure seen on the previous flight, recontact between the first and second stages, by dissipating residual thrust in the first-stage engine before separating them.

Ratsat and the attached second stage are still in orbit as of 2021.

Fifth flight 

SpaceX announced that it had completed construction of the fifth Falcon 1 rocket and was transporting the vehicle to the Kwajalein Atoll launch complex where it was to be launched on 21 April 2009, which would be 20 April 2009 in the United States. Less than a week before the scheduled launch date, Malaysian news reported that unsafe vibration levels had been detected in the rocket and repairs were expected to take about six weeks. On 20 April 2009, SpaceX announced in a press release that the launch had been postponed because of a potential compatibility issue between the RazakSAT spacecraft and the Falcon 1 launch vehicle. A concern had been identified regarding the potential impact of predicted vehicle environments on the satellite. On 1 June, SpaceX announced that the next launch window would open Monday, 13 July and extend through Tuesday, 14 July, with a daily window to open at 21:00 UTC (09:00 local time).

The launch on Monday, 13 July was successful, placing RazakSAT into its initial parking orbit. Thirty-eight minutes later, the rocket's second-stage engine fired again to circularize the orbit. The payload was then successfully deployed. After the launch Elon Musk, founder and CEO of SpaceX, told a reporter the launch had been a success. "We nailed the orbit to well within target parameters...pretty much a bullseye" Musk said.

The Falcon 1 upper stage is still in low Earth orbit as of 2021.

End of Program

Following the fifth flight, future launches of Falcon-1 were postponed, and eventually cancelled, and the vehicle decommissioned from service, with SpaceX stating “We could not make Falcon 1 work as a business.” Launches which had been booked onto Falcon-1 were moved to other vehicles or rebooked as Falcon-9 rideshare payloads.

See also 
Comparison of orbital launch systems
Comparison of orbital launchers families
Falcon 1e
Falcon 9
Vega
List of Vega launches

References 

Videos

Further reading

External links

 SpaceX Falcon 1 Overview

SpaceX launch vehicles
Vehicles introduced in 2006